Gaurav Kapur (born 11 April 1981), also spelled as Gaurav Kapoor is an Indian actor, television and cricket presenter known for being the host of the pre-match Indian Premier League show, Extraaa Innings T20, Cricbuzz Live and his youtube show Breakfast with Champions.

Career 
Gaurav was seventeen when he first got an opportunity to work with FM. After beginning as a radio jockey, he did a travel show called Indian holiday on Sony Television, it was a travel show exploring beautiful Indian locations with Anu Malhotra and people even notice Mini Mathur. He began working as a VJ on Channel V.  He first entered into films with Darna Mana Hai (2003) as Romi. The same year he was seen in another horror flick Ssssshhhh (2003). This was pursueded by Manu Rewal's Chai Pani Etc. (2004), a comedy; White Rainbow (2005); the comedy Kudiyon Ka Hai Zamaana and as Ahmed in Ram Gopal Varma Ki Aag, a remake of Sholay.

In 2008, he was seen in Secrets of the Seven Sounds, Quick Gun Murugan, The Mole and Ugly Aur Pagli. He worked with Anupam Kher and Naseeruddin Shah in Neeraj Pandey's A Wednesday.

Gaurav Kapur played the lead in the comedy Bad Luck Govind (2009) that opened to mixed reviews. He appeared in the film Saluun in 2009. In 2011, he appeared in Chala Mussaddi - Office Office.

He hosted the cricket based talk show Extraaa Innings T20 from 2011 to 2017, covering the Indian Premier League.

In March 2017, Gaurav started a web series called 'Breakfast with Champions' where he interviews and interacts with cricketers and other sports athletes. Many including Steve Smith, Michael Holding, Shoaib Akhtar, Gary Kirsten, Zaheer Khan, Harbhajan Singh, Yuvraj Singh with wife Hazel Keech, Ashish Nehra, Danny Morrison, Gautam Gambhir, Ajinkya Rahane, Dwayne Bravo, Matthew Hayden, Virat Kohli, Cheteshwar Pujara, Rohit Sharma, Sourav Ganguly, Sachin Tendulkar, Rahul Dravid, Smriti Mandhana, Shikhar Dhawan, Yuzvendra Chahal, Bhuvneshwar Kumar, Rashid Khan, Parthiv Patel, Ravi Shastri, Harmanpreet Kaur, Mithali Raj, Abhinav Bindra, Leander Paes and Geeta Phogat have appeared on this show.

Gaurav Kapur co-founded Kommune Arts Private Limited, a performance arts collective, with Ankur Tewari and Roshan Abbas in July 2017.

In 2018, he joined Cricbuzz LIVE as an anchor, an online based cricket talk show covering the Indian Premier League and other Indian cricket team matches.

Personal life 
Gaurav completed his schooling in Mount St. Mary's School.  He completed his undergraduate degree in Sri Venkateswara College in Delhi.

He married actress Kirat Bhattal on 3 November 2014 in Chandigarh. He resides in Bandra, Maharashtra.

Business Interests 
In April 2016, Gaurav started a dedicated sports media and production agency named Oaktree Creative Solutions.

Filmography

Films

Television

Awards and nominations

References 

Indian male television actors
Living people
1981 births
Indian television presenters
Indian VJs (media personalities)